David Lameck Kibikyo is an economist, academic and academic administrator in Uganda. He is the current Vice Chancellor of Busoga University, a private university. He was appointed in 2014, replacing Professor Christopher Bakwesegha, who retired.

Background and education
He holds he degrees of Bachelor of Science in Economics and Master of Arts in Economic Policy and Planning, both from Makerere University, the oldest and largest public university in Uganda. He also holds the degree of Master of Laws in Public International Law, obtained from Kampala International University. His degree of Doctor of Philosophy in Economics was obtained from Roskilde University in Denmark.

Career
Prior to his current position, he served as an associate professor in charge of Research and Quality Assurance at the Kigali Institute of Management. Prior to that, he served as director, at the same institution. In the past, he served as the dean of the School of Economics and Applied Statistics at Kampala International University. Before that, he served as the deputy principal of the College of Economics and Business at the same university.

See also

References

External links
Website of Busoga University

Living people
Ugandan economists
Vice-chancellors of universities in Uganda
Roskilde University alumni
Makerere University alumni
Kampala International University alumni
Academic staff of Busoga University
Academic staff of Kampala International University
Year of birth missing (living people)